Charles Louis de Frédy, Baron de Coubertin (1822–1908) was a French aristocrat and painter. He married a woman from Normandy, Agathe Marie Marcelle Gigault de Crisenoy, with whom he had four children. He was the father of Pierre de Coubertin, founder of the modern Olympic Games. He has been called "a mediocre if fashionable academic painter", and a "somewhat gifted painter of religious and historical subjects". In 1865 he received the Légion d'Honneur for his artistic work.

Notes

1822 births
1908 deaths
Barons of France
19th-century French painters
French male painters
20th-century French painters
20th-century French male artists
Recipients of the Legion of Honour
19th-century French male artists